2018 World Taekwondo Grand Slam - Open Qualification Tournament II is an international G-2 taekwondo tournament which allows the winner to be seeded as 8th on the 2018 World Taekwondo Grand Slam bracket. It also allows the 2nd and 3rd placed athletes to qualify to the event. 

The event was scheduled for October 26-28, 2018 in Wuxi, China. 

This was the second Open Qualification Tournament of the year, the athletes who qualified in this event were ahead of the athletes who qualified on the first event, on the tournament brackets.

Medal summary

Men

Women

Medal table

References 

World Taekwondo Grand Slam
Grand Slam
World Taekwondo Grand Slam
International sports competitions hosted by China
Sport in Wuxi
World Taekwondo Grand Slam